Gladstone State High School is a coeducational public secondary school based in West Gladstone, a suburb of Gladstone in the Gladstone Region in Queensland, Australia. The school has a total enrolment of more than 1500 students per year, with an official count of 1552 students in August 2020.

Gladstone State High School consists of over 125 staff members, including the School Principal, Garry Goltz, as well as five Deputy Principals, two Heads of School, thirteen Heads of Department, six Year Level Coordinators and three Guidance Officers.

Sporting houses

Gladstone State High School includes the following four sporting houses with their respective colours:

Curriculum

Junior Secondary

Years 7 and 8 students at Gladstone State High School undertake the compulsory core subjects of English, Mathematics, Science, Japanese, Health & Physical Education and Humanities & Social Sciences (History and Geography). Each student also undertakes the elective subjects of:

 Business Technology
 Digital Technology
 Home Economics
 Industrial Technology & Design
 Graphics
 Metal Skills
 Wood Skills
 Performing Arts
 Drama
 Music
 Multi-arts Class
 Visual Arts

Year 9 students at Gladstone State High School undertake the compulsory core subjects of English, Mathematics, Pathways to Success, Science, Health & Physical Education and Humanities & Social Sciences. Each student undertakes one semester of History in the faculty of Humanities & Social Sciences and one semester of an elective Humanities & Social Sciences subject; Geography, Ancient History, Civics & Citizenship, Modern History or Indigenous Studies.
Specialisation subjects that are available to Year 9 students include:

 Humanities & Social Sciences
 North Keppel Island Project
 Outdoor Education
 Urban Design
 Japanese
 Robotics
 Technology
 Business Studies
 Food Studies
 Graphics
 Headphones & Hyperlinks
 Industrial Technology & Design
 Money Matters
 Sewing
 The Arts
 Dance
 Drama
 Media
 Music
 Visual Art

Senior Secondary

Year 10

Subjects undertaken by Year 10 students at Gladstone State High School include:

 Applied Design
 Business Studies
 General
 Introduction to Accounting
 Certificate I in Business
 Career Pathways
 Drama
 Early Childhood Studies
 English
 General English
 English Extension
 Graphics
 Health & Physical Education
 General HPE
 Physical Education (elective)
 Home Economics
 Fashion Studies
 Food Studies
 Hospitality
 Humanities & Social Sciences
 Ancient History
 Environment Studies
 Geography
 History (compulsory)
 Legal Studies
 Modern History
 Urban Design
 Industrial Technology
 Furnishing
 Manufacturing
 Information & Communication Technology
 Japanese
 Marine Studies
 Mathematics
 Preparatory Mathematical Methods
 Preparatory Mathematics for Essential & General Mathematics
 Music
 Outdoor Education
 Pathways to Success
 Robotics
 Science
 General Science
 Science Academy Class
 Trade Skills Centre
 Electro
 Logistics
 Visual Arts

Years 11 and 12

Gladstone State High School offers a range of Queensland Curriculum and Assessment Authority (QCAA) General and Applied subjects and Vocational Education & Training (VET) courses to Years 11 and 12 students.

General subjects include:

 The Arts
 Drama
 Music
 Music Extension (Composition)
 Music Extension (Musicology)
 Music Extension (Performance)
 Visual Art
 Design & Technology
 Design
 Digital Solutions
 Engineering
 Food & Nutrition
 English
 General English
 Health & Physical Education
 Physical Education
 Humanities
 Accounting
 Business Education
 Geography
 Legal Studies
 Modern History
 Mathematics
 General Mathematics
 Mathematical Methods
 Specialist Mathematics
 Science
 Biology
 Chemistry
 Marine Science
 Physics

Applied subjects include:

 The Arts
 Visual Arts in Practice
 Design & Technology
 Building & Construction Skills
 Engineering Skills
 Furnishing Skills
 Hospitality Practices
 Industrial Graphics Skills
 Information & Communication Technology
 English
 Essential English
 Health & Physical Education
 Early Childhood Studies
 Sport & Recreation
 Humanities
 Social & Community Studies
 Tourism
 Mathematics
 Essential Mathematics
 Science
 Aquatic Practices
 Science in Practice

Vocational Education & Training (VET) courses include:
 Certificate II in Business
 Certificate II in Hospitality
 Certificate III in Fitness

Extracurricular activities

Art

 Cyril Golding Visual Art Showcase
 Local art and photographic competitions
 School art galleries
 Administration Office
 Alfresco Art Gallery for Awards Night
 Library installations
 School murals
 Talent Show Walkthrough Gallery
 Weekend Visual Art workshops

Camps and excursions

 ARTIE Camp; A reward camp for effort, behaviour and attendance for Indigenous students.
 Arts Immersion Trip; Drama and Visual Art students travel to Brisbane to engage in Drama and Art workshops and attend live shows, Gallery of Modern Art and university tours.
 Coastal Connections; An excursion with Nhulundu Health Centre for Indigenous Students to Facing Island.
 Humanities tour to Canberra
 Leadership Camp 
 North Keppel Camp; A five-day camp at North Keppel Island Environmental Education Centre for students participating in the Year 9 North Keppel Elective.  The camp and elective are focused on identifying environmental issues, designing action plans and promoting active environmental citizenship.
 North West Camp; A seven-day camp at North West Island for Year 11 Biology, Geography and Marine Science students. The camp offers students real-life field studies, scientific research skills, and marine based practical skills.
 Outdoor Education Camps; Outdoor Education (OED) is an elective that Year 9 students can apply for at the end of Year 8 to partake in as part of one of their 4 Year 9 electives. It includes single-sex classes, with boys participating during Semester 1, while girls have their opportunity during Semester 2 and is limited to only 20 students in each class. Each student participates in a range of camps where they have the opportunity to learn/practice skills that are gained in the school setting. On these camps, students have opportunities to participate in recreational activities, which include canoeing/kayaking, high ropes, surfing, fishing, bush cooking, camping and shelter building. The subject focus is on learning to communicate effectively, teamwork and survival skills.
 SEP Camp; A social and life-skilling camp for students in the Special Education Program.

Clubs and societies

 Chess Club
 Human Powered Vehicle Program (HPV)
 Interact Club
 Murri Homework Centre
 Reef Guardian School Program
 Robotics Program
 Tournament of Minds

Dance

 Creative Generation - State Schools Onstage (CGEN)
 Dance Group

Drama

 Combined School Musical
 Touring performances - Brainstorm Productions
 Touring workshops - Shake and Stir
 Weekend Drama Performance Workshops

Music

 Annual Instrumental Music Band Tour
 Creative Generation State Program - Performing Arts, Backstage & Visual Art
 Eisteddfod entries for School Bands
 GSHS Band and Strings performances
 Queensland Symphony Orchestra workshops
 Strings Ensemble
 Symphonic, Concert, Stage and Big Bands
 Tutoring at Primary Instrumental Music Workshops

Sports

Inter-house competitions:
 Cross Country
 House presentations
 Swimming and Athletics Carnivals
 Wheelie Bin and Great Tunnel Ball Races

Inter-school competitions:

 Australia Rules
 Basketball
 Cricket
 Futsal
 Hockey
 Netball
 Rugby League
 Rugby Union
 Soccer
 Swimming
 Touch
 Volleyball

District (Port Curtis), Regional (Capricornia), State and Australian competitions:

 AFL
 Basketball
 Cricket
 Cross Country
 Football
 Golf
 Hockey
 Netball
 Rugby League
 Rugby Union
 Softball
 Squash
 Surfing
 Swimming
 Tennis
 Touch
 Track & Field
 Volleyball
 Water Polo

Sport representatives at School and State Levels for students with disabilities (AWD):
 Cross Country
 Swimming
 Track events; 100, 200, 400, 800, 1500, relay
 Field events; javelin, shotput, discus, long jump

Other activities

 ANZAC and other Returned Service celebrations
 Aspiring Talent and Achievement Program (ATAP); public speaking and group challenges for Indigenous students
 Aurecon Bridge Building Competition
 Bechtel Gladstone Region FIRST Tech Challenge
 Clean Up Australia Day
 Dreamtime Centre excursion; Indigenous and EAL/D students attend the Rockhampton Dreamtime Centre to learn about Indigenous history and culture
 Ecofest
 Energies Futures Workshop
 English competitions
 "Girlz with Purpose" program
 GSHS V.I.T.A.L. Program
 Harbour Festival Street Parade
 Harbour Watch Program
 It's All About ME
 Mathematics competitions
 NAIDOC Week
 National Recycling Week Clothing Swap
 National Youth Science Forum
 QUT Go Further Experience; a camp for Indigenous students in Years 9 and 10 to experience university life
 Red Shield Appeal
 Relay for Life
 Science competitions
 Science Olympiads
 Seniors' Week
 Shave for a Cure/Crazy Hair Day
 Shine Program
 Strength Program
 Tour de Chaplain bike ride
 Virtual Babies Program
 White Card Training (GAGAL)
 Year 11 and 12 CQU Science Challenge

References

External links
 

Public high schools in Queensland
Schools in Central Queensland
Educational institutions established in 1953
1953 establishments in Australia